Gibson Daudau (born 3 September 1988) is a Solomon Islander footballer who plays as a midfielder for Hekari United F.C. in the Papua New Guinea National Soccer League.

References

1988 births
Living people
Solomon Islands footballers
Association football midfielders
Solomon Islands international footballers
Solomon Warriors F.C. players
Tafea F.C. players